Jimmy Ryan is the original vocalist for the heavy metal bands, Haste the Day, Trenches, and Upheaval. Ryan appears on Zao's The Lesser Lights of Heaven DVD. He also has a love for riding his bicycle.

History
Jimmy Ryan formed Upheaval with Brian Allen (Bass), Jeremy King (Drums), Nathan Stambro (Guitars) and Ben Parrish (Guitars) (also in Demiricous) in 1997. The band recorded their debut EP, Downfall of the Ascendancy of Man in 1997. In 1999, Ryan left the band along with Allen, and were replaced by Drew and Bryan Grimes. In 2002, Ryan joined Christian metal outfit, Haste the Day. He recorded on their first Three release and decided to leave in 2005, being replaced by ex-New Day Awakening vocalist Stephen Keech. A year after leaving Haste the Day, Ryan formed Trenches with Phil Hook, Eli Larch Chastain, Bill Scott, and Joel David Lauver. In 2008, the band released their debut album The Tide Will Swallow Us Whole through Solid State Records. The band stated on their Facebook page they were working on a New EP that was to be titled, Reckoner, but Lauver's personal page stated that Trenches had disbanded. In 2012, the band stated they had reunited and were working on the Reckoner album. In 2014, he later rejoined Haste the Day, being featured on the band's 2015 release, Coward.

Bands
Current
 Trenches – vocals (2007–2010, 2012–present)Former' Haste the Day - vocals (2002-2005, 2014-2015) 
 Upheaval – vocals (1997–1999)
 Anapparatus – vocals (2005–2006)

Timeline

Discography
Upheaval
 Downfall of the Ascendancy of Man (1997)
Haste the Day
 That They May Know You (2002)
 Burning Bridges (2004)
 When Everything Falls (2005)
 Coward (2015)
Trenches
 The Tide Will Swallow Us Whole (2008)
Guest Appearances
 "The Fallout, Part 2" by Voices
 "Beheaded" by Demon Hunter (Live in 2004)
 "Communion for Ravens" by Phinehas (2017)

References

Year of birth missing (living people)
Living people
Solid State Records artists
American male singers
American heavy metal singers
Christian metal musicians
American performers of Christian music